Airborn is a 2004 young adult novel by Kenneth Oppel. The novel is set in an alternate history where the airplane has not been invented, and instead, airships are the primary form of air transportation. Additionally, the world contains fictional animal species such as flying creatures that live their entire lives in the sky. The book takes place aboard a transoceanic luxury passenger airship, the Aurora, and is told from the perspective of its cabin boy, Matt Cruse.

Plot summary
Fifteen-year-old Matt Cruse is a cabin boy for the Aurora, an airship that stays afloat using a gas called "hydrium". While on lookout duty, he spots a damaged balloon carrying an unconscious old man. Matt saves the man, whose name is Benjamin Molloy, only to have him die shortly after being taken aboard. His last words ramble about "beautiful creatures" that he supposedly saw on his ill-fated voyage.

One year later, Matt leaves his home in Lionsgate City, a fictionalized Vancouver, to accompany the Aurora on its voyage to Sydney, Australia. Despite loving his mother and sisters dearly, Matt is relieved to be in the air where he feels closest to his father — a former sailmaker who died in an accident aboard the Aurora. Matt is disappointed to learn that the Junior Sailmaker position he was promised has been given to the airship fleet's heir, Bruce Lunardi. One day into the voyage, an ornithopter delivers two passengers to the ship: Kate de Vries and her chaperone Marjorie Simpkins. Kate tells Matt that she is Benjamin Malloy's granddaughter and shows him detailed drawings of flying panther-like creatures from Malloy's journal. Intrigued by the possibility that they live their whole lives in the air, Kate reveals that she is on a mission to prove that such creatures are real.

A few nights later, the ship is raided by a notorious criminal named Vikram Szpirglas. His gang of pirates plunder the ship of all valuables and kill the chief wireless officer. The pirates proceed to leave, but both ships are caught in a storm. The pirate vessel crashes with the Aurora and tears the Aurora's hull, seriously depleting its supply of hydrium. As the sailmakers scramble to repair the falling Aurora, Matt spots an island and the crew steers toward it. The ship crash lands on the island, which Kate realizes is the island from her grandfather's journal. Kate convinces Matt to help her explore the island, where they discover the skeleton of a large winged creature. A few minutes later, they find an injured member of the same species which they decide to call a "cloud cat".

Miss Simpkins tries to lock Kate in her room for associating with Matt. As the repairs near completion, Kate drugs her and takes one last chance to photograph the island's wildlife. Matt and Bruce begin looking for her until they find Kate hidden in a tree saying she found the cloud cat's nest. After luring the cloud cat into a clearing with a fish, the shutter of Kate's camera provokes it into attacking. Bruce suffers severe wounds on his leg from the cloud cat, but Matt and Kate escape into the forest. The two of them stumble upon the pirates, who had set up a secret base on the secluded island. Unrecognized, they ask for shelter in the pirate camp and make a plan to sneak away during the night. During their escape, Kate and Matt are apprehended and thrown into a hydrium pit where there is no oxygen. They use Kate's harem pants as a balloon to lift themselves to ground level as Szpirglas' crew sets out to silence the passengers of the Aurora. Kate begins crying in the forest, blaming herself for putting everyone else in danger. Acting on the feelings he has developed for her, Matt kisses her. She asks him to kiss her again and stops crying.

Once Kate and Matt find Bruce, the three make their way to the Aurora, which is being held hostage by eight pirates. They are able to undo the landing lines and cause the ship to take off. Matt's innate knowledge of the flight system allows them to temporarily take control and steer the ship away from the island. After tending to Bruce's wounds in the infirmary, Matt brings a sleeping elixir to the cook so that it can be added to the pirates' soup. Szpirglas' crew murders Bruce in the engine room and chases Matt onto the hull of the Aurora in the open air. Szpirglas pushes Matt off the edge but Matt is able to grab hold of the ship's tail fin. Before attempting to dislodge Matt again, Szpirglas is attacked by a group of cloud cats and is thrown into the sea. The passengers are saved when Matt steers the Aurora back on course.

Six months later, Matt meets Kate in Paris, where she is exhibiting her cloud cat skeleton and photographs. Matt reveals that he will attend the Airship Academy, with the help of the reward money for finding Szpirglas' base of operations. Kate plans to begin her zoology studies at a university.

Main characters 
 Matt Cruse: The cabin boy on the Aurora and the crow's nest watchman when the novel begins. Longing to support his sisters in Lionsgate city, he has been promised a position as an apprentice sailmaker as soon as one becomes available.
 Kate de Vries: The scientifically minded granddaughter of the alleged discoverer of "cloud cats". Approximately fifteen years of age, she is stubborn and adventurous much to the dismay of her chaperone Marjorie Simpkins.
 Bruce Lunardi: The heir to a successful airship line which owns the Aurora. Consigned to the ship during his late teens, he unintentionally deprives Matt of the sailmaker position.
 Captain Walken: The captain of the Aurora who serves as a mentor to Matt.
 Baz: Another cabin boy on the Aurora who is in the same cabin as Matt Cruse. He is Matt's partner. He is like a brother to Matt
 Vikram Szpirglas: Captain of pirates who attacked the Aurora and made a leak of gas in the Aurora.(main villain)

Awards and nominations
The book won a Governor General's Award for children's literature in 2004.
The book was a Michael L. Printz Award honor book.
The Bulletin of the Center for Children's Books Blue Ribbon award winner.
The book was a 2007 Nutmeg Children's Book Award nominee. It came in fifth place.
The book was a 2006–2007 Rebecca Caudill Young Reader's Book Award nominee.
The book won the Red Maple Award in 2006.
The book won a Ruth and Sylvia Schwartz Children's Book Award in 2005.
The book made the 2006 International Board on Books for Young People list.
The audiobook version, narrated by David Kelly and a full cast, won the 2007 Audie Award for Children's Titles for Ages 12+.

Film adaptation
The book originally was being adapted into a film, to be directed by Stephen Sommers. Thomas Dean Donnelly adapted the screenplay. However, in 2008, Oppel indicated that the project had been dropped.
Announced on March 19, 2012, Halifax Films and Michael Donovan teamed up and optioned the book for film. Oppel was hired to write the preliminary script and would have been an executive producer.
On the frequently asked questions section of his site, Oppel says the most recent producers of his film have dropped out and that he owns rights to the book again.

Publication history 
Airborn was first released in Canada in February 2004. It was shortly followed with its release in the United Kingdom and the United States in April and May 2004 respectively. Below is the release details for the first edition hardback and paperback copies in these three publication regions.

2004, CAN, HarperCollins , Pub date February 5, 2004, Hardback
2004, UK, Hodder Children's Books , Pub date April 15, 2004, Hardback
2004, US, Eos , Pub date May 11, 2004, Hardback
2004, CAN, HarperCollins , Pub date October 21, 2004, Paperback
2005, UK, Hodder Children's Books , Pub date January 13, 2005, Paperback
2005, US, Eos , Pub date May 24, 2005, Paperback

See also

Skybreaker
Starclimber
Silver Wing

References

External links

2004 Canadian novels
Canadian fantasy novels
Canadian alternative history novels
Novels by Kenneth Oppel
Canadian steampunk novels
Aviation novels
HarperCollins books
Governor General's Award-winning children's books
2004 children's books